Mrs. Wilson may refer to:

Mrs Wilson, a British television series
Ellen Axson Wilson, first wife of American President Woodrow Wilson
Edith Wilson (1872–1961), second wife of American President Woodrow Wilson
Nancy Mann Waddel Woodrow (1860s–1935), American writer, often credited as Mrs. Wilson Woodrow

See also
List of people with surname Wilson